Crenicichla iguassuensis is a species of cichlid native to South America. It is found in the Paraná River basin, in the Iguaçu River basin and reported to be from the Uruguay streams in Argentina.

References

Kullander, S.O., 2003. Cichlidae (Cichlids). p. 605-654. In R.E. Reis, S.O. Kullander and C.J. Ferraris, Jr. (eds.) Checklist of the Freshwater Fishes of South and Central America. Porto Alegre: EDIPUCRS, Brasil. 

iguassuensis
Fish of Argentina
Taxa named by John Diederich Haseman
Fish described in 1911